Deli Serdang (Jawi: دلي سردڠ) is a regency in the Indonesian province of North Sumatra.  It surrounds the city of Medan, and also borders the city of Binjai, which is effectively a bedroom community for Medan. It occupies an area of 2,497.72 sq.km (964.38  sq miles). The capital of the district is Lubuk Pakam, which is located approximately 30 km east of Medan.  The national census of 2000 recorded 1,573,987 people, but by 2010 the regency's population increased by 13.76% to 1,790,431, and at the 2020 Census the total was 1,931,441. The official estimate as at mid 2022 was 1,953,986. Kualanamu International Airport is located in this regency.

Neighbouring areas 

The external boundaries of the regency are with:
 To the north: the Langkat Regency and the Strait of Malacca.
 To the south: the Karo Regency and Simalungun Regency.
 To the east: the Serdang Bedagai Regency and the Strait of Malacca.
 To the west: the Karo Regency, Langkat Regency and the city of Binjai.

The city of Medan is an enclave within the regency.

Administrative districts 

The regency is divided into twenty-two districts (kecamatan), tabulated below with their areas (in sq.km) and their 2010 Census and 2020 Census populations, and the official estimates as at mid 2022. The table also includes the locations of the district administrative centres, the number of administrative villages (desa and kelurahan) within each district and its post code:

London Sumatra (LONSUM) protests 
Deli Serdang Regency contains three plantations owned by London Sumatra (LONSUM).

In June 2004, farmers and indigenous peoples in a number of villages within the district had protested over land ownership of their villages (apparently, the government had leased the land in the villages to LONSUM, but they rejected such leasings and resisted moving). It is said that the authorities had shot farmers and indigenous people attempting to reoccupy the villages.

Television

See also 
Sultanate of Deli
Sultanate of Serdang

References 

Regencies of North Sumatra